Vitaly Vladimirovich Danilov (born 12 June 1980 in Shchyolkovo, Moscow Oblast, Russia) is a Russian wheelchair curler, 2020 World champion.

Teams

References

External links 

 Виталий Данилов | ПКР | Паралимпийский комитет России
 
 Список кандидатов в спортивные сборные команды Российской Федерации по спорту лиц с поражением ОДА (зимние дисциплины) на сезон 2017-2018 г.г. (см. "Дисциплина: Кёрлинг на колясках")

Living people
1980 births
Sportspeople from Moscow Oblast
People from Shchyolkovsky District
Russian male curlers
Russian wheelchair curlers
World wheelchair curling champions